Polemon of Athens (fl. 2nd century BC) was an ancient Greek Stoic philosopher and geographer. Of Athenian citizenship, he was most widely known as Polemon of Athens, but he was born either in Ilium, Samos, or Sicyon, and was also known as Polemon of Ilium and Polemon Periegetes. He traveled throughout Greece and wrote about the places he visited. He also compiled a collection of the epigrams he saw on the monuments and votive offerings. None of these works survive, but many later writers quote from them.

Life
Polemon was the son of Euegetes, and he was a contemporary of Aristophanes of Byzantium and Ptolemy Epiphanes.  He was a follower of the Stoic philosopher Panaetius. He made extensive journeys throughout Greece to collect materials for his geographical works, in the course of which he paid particular attention to the inscriptions on votive offerings and on columns, whence he obtained the surname of Stelokopas.

Works
In his travels, Polemon collected the epigrams he found into a work On the inscriptions to be found in cities. In addition, other works of his are mentioned, upon the votive offerings and monuments in the Acropolis of Athens, at Lacedaemon, at Delphi, and elsewhere, which no doubt contained copies of numerous epigrams. His works may have been a chief source of the Garland of Meleager. Athenaeus, Sextus Julius Africanus and other writers make very numerous quotations from his works. They were chiefly descriptions of different parts of Greece; some are on paintings preserved in various places, and several are controversial, among which is one against Eratosthenes.

Sir James Frazer considered him the most learned of all Greek antiquaries. "His acquaintance both with the monuments and with the literature seems to have been extensive and profound. The attention which he bestowed on inscriptions earned for him the nickname of the 'monument-tapper.'"
 The fragments of Polemon have been published by Preller in the work entitled Polemonis Periegetae Fragmenta, collegit, digessit, notis auxit L. Preller, Lips., 1838.

References

Sources
 David Engels: Polemon von Ilion. Antiquarische Periegese und hellenistische Identitätssuche, in: K. Freitag/Chr. Michels (eds.), Athen und / oder Alexandreia? Aspekte von Identität und Ethnizität im hellenistischen Griechenland, Köln / Weimar / Wien 2014, p. 65–98.
 

2nd-century BC Athenians
Ancient Athenian philosophers
Ancient Greek anthologists
Ancient Greek geographers
Hellenistic-era philosophers in Athens
Stoic philosophers
Year of birth unknown
Year of death unknown
2nd-century BC geographers